The Bulletin of the Brazilian Mathematical Society is a quarterly peer-reviewed scientific journal covering all areas of mathematics. It is the official journal of the Brazilian Mathematical Society and is published on their behalf by Springer Science+Business Media. The journal was established in 1970 as the Boletim da Sociedade Brasileira de Matemática, obtaining its current title in 1989. The editor-in-chief is Daniel Pellegrino (Universidade Federal da Paraiba).

Abstracting and indexing
The journal is abstracted and indexed in:

According to the Journal Citation Reports, the journal has a 2020 impact factor of 1.177.

References

External links

English-language journals
Mathematics journals
Quarterly journals
Publications established in 1970
Springer Science+Business Media academic journals
Brazilian Mathematical Society